James Elisha Brown (1913–1974) was a member of the Canadian House of Commons. 

James E. Brown may also refer to:

 James E. Brown III (born 1954), United States Air Force officer and test pilot
 Jim Ed Brown (1934–2015), American country music singer
 James Hall (actor) (born James E. Brown, 1900–1940), American film actor